Borostomias is a genus of barbeled dragonfishes.

The name derives from Greek βόρος (bóros, "glutton") and στομίας (stomías, "hard-mouthed horse").

Species
There are currently six recognized species in this genus:
 Borostomias abyssorum (Koehler (fr), 1896)
 Borostomias antarcticus (Lönnberg, 1905) (Snaggletooth)
 Borostomias elucens (A. B. Brauer, 1906)
 Borostomias mononema (Regan & Trewavas, 1929) (Sickle snaggletooth)
 Borostomias pacificus (S. Imai, 1941)
 Borostomias panamensis Regan & Trewavas, 1929 (Panama snaggletooth)

References

Stomiidae
Taxa named by Charles Tate Regan
Marine fish genera
Ray-finned fish genera